Shleu-Shleu is a kompa band formed on 22 December 1965 in Bas-Peut de Chose, Port-au-Prince by former members of the groupes Lorenceau and Memfoubins, managed by Hugues "Dada" Jackaman (or Djakaman) an Arab Haitian businessman of Palestinian origin, and directed by Tony Moïse on the ashes of Les Manfoubins created by Jean Baptiste, Jacques Vabre, Camille Philippe and Kiki Bayard and Following the demise of Les Frères Lorenceau. During their first appearance, Nemours Jean-Baptiste renamed them Mini Jazz, due to their reduced format, thus unknowingly coining the term mini-jazz, also referring to the mini-skirt fashion of the time. The new band was composed of a solo saxophonist, Tony Moise, Jean-Claude Pierre-Charles (a.k.a. Peddy) and Hans Cherubin (a.k.a. Gro Bébé) on lead vocals. After living throughout Haiti, they achieved international notoriety, and in 1970, they were hired to travel to New York City to perform at Casa Borinquen. They decided to stay in NYC. They have played in many large American cities, spreading many of the musical gems of the Haitian diaspora. In 1976, many of the original members of the band had to leave New York for several reasons. This instability created a period of decline that lasted until 1991 when Jean-Baptiste Smith decided to revive the band with the addition of new musicians, such as the talented saxophonist Evens Latortue, guitarist Eddy Altine, percussionist Joseph Savius.

Members

Past members

Eddy Altine
Yves-Arsene Appolon
Jacques Yves Jean-Baptiste
Georges Loubert Chancy
Hans Cherubin
Gerald Desir
Ti Paul Edmé
Hugues Jackaman
Franky Jean-Baptiste
Evens Latortue
Joseph-Mario Mayala
Frederic Mews
Leon Millien
Tony Moïse
Jean-Claude Pierre-Charles
Serge Rosenthal
Fito Sadrac
Joseph Savius
Jean-Baptiste Smith
Clovis St. Louis
Antonio Saint Louis
Jean-Michel St. Victor (a.k.a. Zouzoule)
Jean-Ely Telfort
Johnny-Franz Toussaint

Discography 

1967 Haiti, Mon Pays	
1969 Tête Chauve
1969 Haïti, Terre De Soleil
1970 Cé La Ou Yé
1971 6ème Anniversaire
1972 Succès Des Shleu-Shleu A Paris
1973 A New York - Maestro Tony Moise
1973 Acé Frapé
1974 Toujours Le Même 4-3
1974 En Filant Les Aiguilles
1974 Grille Ta Cigarette
1975 Original Shleu-Shleu
1975 Immortel
1976 Le Bal Des Orchestres
1976 Aux Fanatiques Du Monde Entier
1977 Crapaud
1978 JSS
1980 Toujours Là!
1981 Celebration
1981 A La Cocoteraie
1982 Back To Stay
1983 No Money No Honey
1983 Succes
1991 Pionniers "La Tradition Continue..."
1994 Souvenirs

References

External links

radiotelevisioncaraibes.com biography article

Haitian musical groups
Haitian-American culture in New York City